Kashif (also spelled Kaashif, Kaşif, Khasif or Kashef) is an Arabic word, commonly used as a male given name in the Muslim world.  Its meaning is close to the "revealer", "discoverer", "uncoverer" or "pioneer", "explorer".

When used by Muslims, it is done so in the context of its Qur'anic usage referring to God as "the One who reveals."  When applied to an individual, it means that the person has the quality of spiritual vision.  The truth is obvious to them while hidden to others.  For example, in the Qur'an (Surah Al-Sajdah Chapter 32: Verse 13), God refers to a people who have just died and suddenly see the error of their ways and the purpose of life which previously eluded them.  After this realization, they ask God to send them back, as they now believe and want to do good works. Those who are "Kashif" have that understanding before death.

Given name
 Kashif (musician) (1956–2016), American musician and singer
 Kashif Abbasi (born 1974), Pakistani journalist
 Kashif Ahmed (born 1975), Pakistani and United Arab Emirates cricketer
 Kashif Bangnagande (born 2001), Japanese footballer
 Kashif Bhatti (born 1986), Pakistani cricketer
 Kashif Daud (born 1986), Pakistani cricketer
 Kashif Ibrahim (born 1977), Pakistani cricketer
 Kashif Jawad (born 1981), Pakistani field hockey player
 Kashif Naved (born 1983), Pakistani cricketer
 Kashif Nisar, Pakistani television director and screenwriter
 Kashif Raza (born 1979), Pakistani cricketer
 Kashif Shafi (born 1976), Pakistani cricketer
 Kashif Shah (born 1993), Pakistani field hockey player
 Kashif Sharif (born 1987), Kuwaiti cricketer
 Kashif Shuja (born 1979), Pakistani-born New Zealand squash player
 Kashif Siddiq (born 1981), Pakistani cricketer
 Kashif Siddiqi (born 1986), English-born Pakistani footballer
 Kashif Mahmood (cricketer, born 1995), Pakistani cricketer

Surname
 Hameed Kashif (born 1977), American basketball player
 Ibrahim al Kashif, Sudanese singer popular 1940–1956
 Mohammad Kashif (Dutch cricketer) (born 1984), Dutch cricketer from Punjab
 Tolga Kashif (born 1962), Turkish-Cypriot composer from London

Arabic-language surnames
Arabic masculine given names